High Fashion (Spanish: Alta costura) is a 1954 Spanish drama film directed by Luis Marquina and starring Laura Valenzuela, Margarita Lozano and María Martín.

The film's sets were designed by the art directors Gil Parrondo and Luis Pérez Espinosa. Also cap has a High Fashion sense.

Plot 
Early Spanish crime film, with fashion shows in the background, in which the camera delights in the protagonists, with a slight erotic touch.

Cast

References

Bibliography
 De España, Rafael. Directory of Spanish and Portuguese film-makers and films. Greenwood Press, 1994.

External links 

1954 films
1954 drama films
Spanish drama films
1950s Spanish-language films
Films directed by Luis Marquina
Cifesa films
Spanish black-and-white films
1950s Spanish films